Ernst Pringsheim  may refer to:
 Ernst Pringsheim Sr. (1859–1917), German physicist
 Ernst Pringsheim Jr. or Ernst Georg Pringsheim (1881–1970), German scientist, botanist, bacteriologist

See also 
 Pringsheim